Aparna Vastarey, known mononymously as Aparna, is an Indian actress, television presenter and a former radio jockey. A popular face in Kannada television, she is known for her work as a presenter of various shows that aired on DD Chandana in the 1990s. She made her film debut in 1984 with Puttanna Kanagal's final film, Masanada Hoovu. Since 2015, she has been appearing as Varalakshmi on the sketch comedy show, Majaa Talkies.

Career
Aparna made her feature film debut in Puttanna Kanagal's 1984 film, Masanada Hoovu, starring alongside stalwarts Ambareesh and Jayanthi. She began working as a radio jockey (RJ) with All India Radio in 1993, and went on to work with AIR FM Rainbow, as its first presenter. Her career in Kannada television as a presenter began in 1990 with DD Chandana; she was part of a majority of its productions until 2000. As part of Deepawali celebrations in 1998, she created a record by presenting shows for eight hours at a stretch.

Aparna has worked as an actress in television shows such as Moodala Mane and Mukta. In 2013, she appeared as a contestant in the first season of the Kannada reality television show Bigg Boss that aired on ETV Kannada. Since 2015, she has been appearing in the sketch comedy television show, Majaa Talkies, as Varalakshmi, the vain and boastful sister-in-law of the character of Srujan Lokesh who claims to be friends of popular personalities like Barack Obama and Salman Khan.

In 2011, Aparna lent her voice for the recorded announcements of passenger-boarding and deboarding for the Bangalore Metro.

Partial filmography

Television

Films
 Masanada Hoovu (1985)
 Sangrama (1987)
 Nammoora Raja (1988)
 Sahasa Veera (1988)
 Matru Vathsalya (1988)
 Olavina Asare (1989)
 Inspector Vikram (1989)
 Ondaagi Balu (1989)
 Doctor Krishna (1989)
 Onti Salaga (1989)
 Chakravarthy (1990)

References

Actresses in Kannada cinema
Indian film actresses
Actresses in Kannada television
Indian women television presenters
Indian television presenters
Actresses from Bangalore
21st-century Indian actresses
Indian television actresses
20th-century Indian actresses
Bigg Boss Kannada contestants
Living people
Year of birth missing (living people)